The SZD-9 Bocian (Polish: "Stork") is a multi-purpose two-seat sailplane that was designed and built in Poland at Szybowcowy Zakład Doświadczalny (Glider Experimental Works) in Bielsko-Biała, beginning in 1952. It was designed  to be capable of fulfilling the needs of every area from training to competition flying.

History
Main designer was Marian Wasilewski, with Roman Zatwarnicki and Justyn Sandauer. The prototype SZD-9 flew for the first time on 10 March 1952, piloted by Adam Zientek. After flight testing was completed, suggested changes were incorporated into the design and production began, as SZD-9bis Bocian-1A (or simply "Bocian A"). The first production unit flew for the first time on 13 March 1953, and 11 units were built.

Apart from use in Poland, the type was exported to 27 countries, including Austria, Australia, Belgium, China, France, Greece, India, Norway, former East Germany and West Germany, Switzerland, Tunisia, Turkey, Venezuela, United Kingdom, and the Soviet Union. Polish pilots set many international records flying SZD-9s.

Variants
SZD-9 Bocian – two prototypes
SZD-9bis Bocian-1A – the first variant, 11 built
SZD-9bis Bocian-1B – improved variant (e.g. bigger tailfin), 11 built
SZD-9bis Bocian-1C – improved variant of 1954 (wings swept at lesser angle, modified control surfaces and rear skid), 40 built
SZD-9bis Bocian-Z  – modified competition variant for 1956 World Gliding Competition, 3 built (2 rebuilt of Bocian C)
SZD-9bis Bocian-1D – improved variant of 1958 (bigger wheel and minor modifications), 186 built
SZD-9bis Bocian-1E – modified trainer variant of 1967 (straight wing tips, two-part canopy instead of three-part, landing gear with shock absorbers), 366 built
SZD-33 Bocian 3 – intended to replace SZD-9's and SZD-10's but discontinued in favour of the SZD-9bis Bocian-1E.

Specifications (SZD-9bis)

See also

References

Further reading

SZD-09
SZD-09
Aircraft first flown in 1952
Shoulder-wing aircraft
Forward-swept-wing aircraft